"Fugitive" is the first single taken from David Gray's eighth studio album Draw the Line. The song had its first exclusive play on Ken Bruce's BBC Radio 2 show on 21 July 2009 and was released in the UK on 7 September 2009.

Gray stated in an interview that the title and lyrics of the track were inspired by an image he had of Saddam Hussein being pulled out of his spider hole. Gray performed the song on 25 September 2009 on the Late Show with David Letterman and an acoustic version on GMTV, saying that the song was "about hiding from life, from yourself. It's saying don't forsake it all because there's something keeping you upright and keeping you walking down the street." The single features the exclusive B-side "Jitterbug."

"Fugitive" was chosen as the Starbucks–iTunes "Pick of the Week" for September 15, 2009.

Music video
The music video was directed by Dan Lumb and features Gray performing live at the piano. As he sings, the surrounding walls, floor and ceiling fill with images expressing the mood and urgency of the song. Gray was shot over a day and artist/animator Will Barras meticulously painted each scene on to the walls, etc. to mirror Gray's performance the following day.

Critical and commercial reception 
"Fugitive" received generally positive reviews. Digital Spy called it "a solid return" while MusicOMH labeled it "an excellent, upbeat lead single", but the BBC reported that almost 2 weeks after its release, it had yet to crack the top 100 on the UK Singles Chart. The single also performed poorly on the Swiss Music Charts, where it entered and peaked at number 84, charting for only one week.

Personnel
David Gray - vocals, piano, acoustic guitar, Wurlitzer, hi-strung, vox organ, vibraphone, harmonium
Neill MacColl - electric guitar, acoustic guitar, mandolin, hi-strung, backing vocals
Robbie Malone - bass, electric guitar, acoustic guitar, harmonium, backing vocals
Keith Prior - drums, percussion, backing vocals
Iestyn Polson - programming

Track listing
 "Fugitive" – 3:46
 "Jitterbug" – 3:26

References

David Gray (musician) songs
2009 singles
Songs written by David Gray (musician)
2008 songs
Polydor Records singles
Songs written by Rob Malone